Apple Symbols is a font introduced in Mac OS X 10.3 "Panther." This is a TrueType font, intended to provide coverage for characters defined as symbols in the Unicode Standard. It continues to ship with Mac OS X as part of the default installation. Prior to Mac OS X 10.5, its path was /Library/Fonts/Apple Symbols.ttf.  From Mac OS X 10.5 onward, is to be found at /System/Library/Fonts/Apple Symbols.ttf, meaning it is now considered an essential part of the system software, not to be deleted by users.

The version of the font as of Mac OS X 10.5 is 6.0d7e4.

It remains to be available in modern macOS versions such as macOS Ventura.

List of glyphs
The Mac OS X version of the font contains over 5000 glyphs from the following Unicode blocks:
 U+0000–U+007F Basic Latin
 U+0080–U+00FF Latin-1 Supplement
 U+0180–U+024F Latin Extended-B
 U+02B0–U+02FF Spacing Modifier Letters
 U+0300–U+036F Combining Diacritical Marks
 U+0370–U+03FF Greek and Coptic
 U+1F00–U+1FFF Greek Extended
 U+2000–U+206F General Punctuation
 U+2070–U+209F Superscripts and Subscripts
 U+20A0–U+20CF Currency Symbols
 U+2100–U+214F Letterlike symbols
 U+2150–U+218F Number Forms
 U+2190–U+21FF Arrows
 U+2200–U+22FF Mathematical Operators
 U+2300–U+23FF Miscellaneous Technical
 U+2400–U+243F Control Pictures
 U+2440–U+245F Optical Character Recognition
 U+2500–U+257F Box Drawing
 U+2580–U+259F Block Elements
 U+25A0–U+25FF Geometric Shapes
 U+2600–U+26FF Miscellaneous Symbols
 U+27C0–U+27EF Miscellaneous Mathematical Symbols-A
 U+27F0–U+27FF Supplemental Arrows-A
 U+2800–U+28FF Braille Patterns
 U+2900–U+297F Supplemental Arrows-B
 U+2980–U+29FF Miscellaneous Mathematical Symbols-B
 U+2A00–U+2AFF Supplemental Mathematical Operators
 U+2B00–U+2BFF Miscellaneous Symbols and Arrows
 U+2E80–U+2EFF CJK Radicals Supplement
 U+2F00–U+2FDF Kangxi Radicals
 U+4DC0–U+4DFF Yijing Hexagram Symbols
 U+A700–U+A71F Modifier Tone Letters
 U+FE50–U+FE6F Small Form Variants
 U+FE70–U+FEFF Arabic Presentation Forms-B
 U+FF00–U+FFEF Halfwidth and Fullwidth Forms
 U+FFF0–U+FFFF Specials
 U+10100–U+1013F Aegean Numbers
 U+10140–U+1018F Ancient Greek Numbers
 U+10190–U+101CF Ancient Symbols
 U+10400–U+1044F Deseret
 U+10450–U+1047F Shavian
 U+1D100–U+1D1FF Musical Symbols
 U+1D300–U+1D35F Tai Xuan Jing Symbols
 U+1D360–U+1D37F Counting Rod Numerals
 U+1D400–U+1D7FF Mathematical alphanumeric symbols

History

Apple lists this font as Copyright 2003.

Mac OS X 10.3
Introduced with the following:
 General Punctuation
 Currency Symbols
 Letterlike Symbols
 Arrows
 Mathematical Operators
 Optical Character Recognition
 Box Drawing
 Block Elements
 Geometric Shapes
 Miscellaneous Symbols
 Deseret

Mac OS X 10.4
Version 5.0d5e1:
 Braille
 Yijing Hexagram Symbols 
 Small Form Variants
 Musical Symbols
 Tai Xuan Jing Symbols
 glyph variants

Mac OS X 10.5
Apple Symbols was significantly extended for its Mac OS X v10.5 ("Leopard") release, version 6.0d7e4 (2007-08-03), and more than tripled its glyph repertoire.  As well as additions to the Unicode blocks partially covered by earlier releases, the font included new glyphs for Latin, Greek, Shavian, and the following Unicode blocks:

 U+02B0–U+02FF Spacing Modifier Letters
 U+0300–U+036F Combining Diacritical Marks
 U+2070–U+209F Superscripts and Subscripts
 U+2150–U+218F Number Forms
 U+2300–U+23FF Miscellaneous Technical
 U+2400–U+243F Control Pictures
 U+27C0–U+27EF Miscellaneous Mathematical SU+27FF Supplemen–U+297F Supplemental–U+29FF Miscellaneous Mathematical Symbols-B
 U+2A00–U+2AFF Supplemental Mathematical Operators
 U+2B00–U+2BFF Miscellan+A71F Modifier Tone Letters
 U+FE70–U+FEFF Arabic Presentation Forms-B
 U+FF00–U+FFEF Halfwidth and fullwidth forms
 U+FFF0–U+FFFF Specials
 U+10100–U+1013F Aeg
 U+1D360–U+1D37F Counting Rod Numerals
 U+1D400–U+1D7FF Mathematical alphanumeric symbols

References

Apple Mac OS X's utility Font Book

Symbols
Unicode
Symbols
MacOS
Typefaces and fonts introduced in 2003
Symbol typefaces